Governance Center for Public Policies (GCPP) (Arabic: مركز حوكمة للسياسات العامة) is an Iraqi NGO founded in 2010 and governance research institution and one of the centers of thinking and quality research work (Think Tank), it seeks to effectively contribute in supporting the sustainable development orientations, and assisting the governance efforts and good management . it also contributes in creating Social awareness towards the strategic issues in Iraq and works with its stakeholders to support achieving a developmental environment based on civil rights, freedom, democracy and strengthen the role of the private sector, support the issues of women and disadvantaged groups, realize the requirements of social peace and the rule of law, supporting good institutional management through building bridges between those who have creative ideas and the ones in need for them, in the light of that taking care of applied intellectual creativity that serve the directions of growth and development efforts.

Projects 
The Governance Center for Public policies works in partnership with the national fund for supporting democracy (NED group) to do workshops, national conferences about seven national issues:

1. National Reconciliation – the center held a number of workshops for this topic in (Baghdad, Babil, Dhi Qar Governorate and Basrah) in addition to a regional conference in Baghdad.

2. The Governance center within his partnership program with (NED) has numerous workshops in Baghdad and the other provinces about several issues: election system, parties law, economic policy, combat corruption, education policies.

a. Governance center held a conference about the reform of the agriculture sector and livestock in Iraq in collaboration with the provincial Council .

b. Governance center participated within Shahrazad Campaign held by the Iraqi women journalists forum about the protection and safety of women journalists and defenders of Human Rights .

c. Governance Center took part in preparing and drafting the strategy of national reconciliation with the prime Minister's office in collaboration with Finnish Organization (CMI).

d. Governance Center participated in Iraqi Forum for Intellectuals & Academics Conference held in Istanbul about women issues.

E- E-The Governance center within his partnership program with Konrad-Adenauer-Stiftung (KAS) has many workshops in Baghdad, Anbar, Najaf, Babylon, about Supporting UN SDG16 Through Improved Accountability and Governance .[14]

F- The Governance center within his partnership program with Institute on Governance has workshop in Karbala about Monitoring the implementation of the general budget in Iraq.[15]

References 

14. حوكمة وكونراد أديناور يقيمان ورشة تدريبية في كربلاء حول الديمقراطية التشاركية في الحكومات المحلية
15. مركز حوكمة ومعهد الحوكمة الكندي يقيمان في كربلاء ورشة الرقابة على تنفيذ الموزانة العامة

External links 
 Governance Center for Public Policies website
 Governance Center for Public Policies on Youtube

Organizations established in 2010
2010 establishments in Iraq
Think tanks based in Iraq